Jerry Alvin Fowler (June 20, 1927 – June 15, 2008) was a professional basketball player who spent one season in the National Basketball Association (NBA) as a member of the Milwaukee Hawks during the 1951–52 season. He also played with the Kansas City Hi-Spots of the National Professional Basketball League (1950–1951). He attended the University of Missouri. He later toured with the Harlem Globetrotters as a member of the Toledo Mercurys.

References

External links
 
Statistics at StatsCrew.com

1927 births
2008 deaths
American Basketball League (1925–1955) players
American men's basketball players
Centers (basketball)
Milwaukee Hawks players
Missouri Tigers men's basketball players
Undrafted National Basketball Association players
Utica Pros players